After the Lights is the fifth album of Sweetbox and the fourth album with Jade Villalon as frontwoman. It was released in 2004 in Japan. On various online stores, the CD is listed as Sweetbox Presents a Very Sweet X-Mas, although only 4 songs on the album are Christmas carols.

In 2005, two different versions of the album were released in Korea, with one version being a special two-disc Christmas edition. The 3rd edition was called 13 Chapters, but was an album composed of the more popular songs from both Adagio and After the Lights. The album saw a shift in the lyrical style of Jade's writing, this time showcasing many songs written in 3rd person fashion, involving tales of lovers or people dealing with personal struggle, instead of a 1st person approach. The songs also were all based on original musical compositions written by Jade and Geo, with the exception of the holiday carols.

Track listing

Credits
 Executive Producer – Heiko Schmidt
 Producer – Geo

2004 albums
Sweetbox albums